Percy Douglas Ferguson (23 January 1880 – 2 June 1952) was an Australian politician. He was a Country Party member of the Western Australian Legislative Assembly from 1927 to 1939, representing Moore until 1930 and Irwin-Moore thereafter. He served as Minister for Agriculture from 1930 to 1933 in the coalition government led by Sir James Mitchell.

References

1880 births
1952 deaths
National Party of Australia members of the Parliament of Western Australia
Members of the Western Australian Legislative Assembly